OpenMediaVault (OMV) is a free Linux distribution designed for network-attached storage (NAS). The project's lead developer is Volker Theile, who instituted it in 2009. OMV is based on the Debian operating system, and is licensed through the GNU General Public License v3.

Background
By the end of 2009, Volker Theile was the only active developer of FreeNAS, a NAS operating system that Olivier Cochard-Labbé started developing from m0n0wall in 2005. m0n0wall is a variation of the FreeBSD operating system, and Theile decided he wanted to rewrite FreeNAS for Linux. The project team had known for months that FreeNAS needed a major rewrite in order to support crucial features. Since Cochard-Labbé preferred to stay with a FreeBSD-based system, he and Theile agreed that Theile would develop his Linux version under a different name; that name was initially coreNAS, but within a matter of days Theile discarded it in favour of OpenMediaVault.

Meanwhile, FreeNAS still needed to be rewritten and maintained. To accomplish this, Cochard-Labbé handed development over to iXsystems, an American company that developed the TrueOS (Discontinued in 2020) operating system.

Technical design
Theile chose Debian because the large number of programs in its package management system meant that he wouldn't have to spend time repackaging software himself. OpenMediaVault makes a few changes to the Debian operating system. It provides a Web-based user interface for administration and customisation, and a plug-in API for implementing new features. One can install plug-ins through the Web interface.

Features 

 Multi-language, Web-based graphical user interface
 Protocols: CIFS (via Samba), FTP, NFS (versions 3 and 4), SSH, rsync, iSCSI, AFP and TFTP
 Software-RAID (levels 0, 1, 4, 5, 6, and 10, plus JBOD)
 Monitoring: Syslog, Watchdog, S.M.A.R.T., SNMP (v1, 2c, and 3) (read-only)
 Statistic reports via e-mail
 Statistic graphs for the CPU-workload, LAN transfer rates, hard disk usage and RAM allocation
 GPT/EFI partitioning >2 TByte possible
 File systems: ext2, ext3, ext4, Btrfs, XFS, JFS, NTFS, FAT32
 Quota
 User and group management
 Access controls via ACL
 Link aggregation bonding, Wake-on-LAN
 Plug-in system

Plug-ins 
 ClamAV - Antivirus software
 Digital Audio Access Protocol (DAAP) – provides audio files in a local network (also for iTunes)
 SAN and iSCSI – block based access datastores over the network
 Sabnzbd, an NNTP reader designed for automated retrieval of binary files
 Lightweight Directory Access Protocol (LDAP) – Information request and changes of a directory service
 Logical Volume Manager - enables the possibility to create and administrate dynamic partitions
 Netatalk – File-, time- and print-server for Apple Macintosh
 Network UPS Tools, to support the use of an uninterruptible power supply
 Easy changes to the routing tables
 usbbackup, which allows (automatic) backups to external USB hard disks
 Plex server and webclient, but only for version 4 and prior. Versions 5 and up rely on the Plex Docker container.
 Transmission (BitTorrent client)
 OwnCloud – a suite of client-server software for creating file hosting services
 and many more

Additional plug-ins 
Additional plug-ins are available via additional package repositories. The majority of those Plug-ins are developed by a group called OpenMediaVault Plugin Developers. The status of all Plug-ins can be viewed online. In October 2014 there were around 30 plugins available. In June 2015 there were more than 70 stable plug-ins available.

Third-party plug-ins 
Some of the software that is controllable via third-party plug-ins are:

Aufs, Greyhole, Union mount, and SnapRAID
Transmission, a BitTorrent client
BitTorrent Sync
Calibre, e-book manager
CUPS, print server
eXtplorer, Web-based file manager
 pyLoad / JDownloader, download managers 
MySQL / MariaDB, database server
Nginx, Web server
OpenVPN AS, virtual private networking
Plex, media server
SYSLINUX, Preboot Execution Environment (PXE)
Roundcube, Web-based mail client
Clonezilla / rsnapshot / SystemRescueCD, backup
Sickbeard / SABnzdb / Headphones / Couch Potato, Usenet download managers
Subsonic, Web-based media streamer and jukebox
Video Disk Recorder
VirtualBox, virtual machine host
WordPress, blog software
ZFS, an advanced file system
 and many more

Minimum System requirements 

 Any Architecture/hardware that is supported by Debian
 1 GiB RAM
 4 GiB hard drive, solid-state drive, or USB flash drive with static wear leveling support for the OS.
 1 hard drive, solid-state drive, or USB flash drive for storing user data

Release history 
For each OpenMediaVault release, Theile chooses a project code name from Frank Herbert's Dune novels.

See also 

 Comparison of iSCSI targets
 Direct Attached Storage (DAS)
 Storage Area Network (SAN)
 TrueNAS (formerly FreeNAS) - the FreeBSD-based NAS from which OpenMediaVault was originally forked
 NexentaOS -  open source OS and enterprise class NAS with kernel based ZFS
 Openfiler - CentOS-based NAS operating system
 Windows Home Server
 XigmaNAS - another FreeBSD-based NAS operating system, XigmaNAS is a continuation of the original FreeNAS code which was developed between 2005 and late 2011
 Zentyal

References

External links 
 
 
 OpenMediaVault on DistroWatch
 OpenMediaVault on PcMac

Free file transfer software
Debian
Network-attached storage
Home servers
Free software